A stabbing attack happened on 10 November 2022 in Brussels, Belgium, killing a police officer and injuring another. Authorities suspect the attack to be terror-related. The attacker shouted the Arabic phrase allahu akbar while committing the stabbing.

Background 
During the late 20th and early 21st century, bombing and stabbing attacks have been carried out in Brussels, including those in 1979, 2014, 2016, June 2017, August 2017 and 2018.

Incident 
At around 18:15 (GMT) close to the city's Brussels-North railway station two officers were stabbed before the attacker was shot in the legs and abdomen by another police patrol arriving at the scene. One of the police officers died after being stabbed in the neck. The other wounded officer as well as the attacker were hospitalised.

Suspect 
The suspect is a 32-year-old Belgian named Yassine Mahi, who was born and domiciled in Brussels. He was known to the Belgian security authorities and appeared on a list of radicalized Muslims. In the morning on the same day the stabbing incident happened, he made threats against the police on a police station. Despite the threats he was not arrested but instead brought by the police to the psychiatric unit of the Saint-Luc hospital, where he stayed voluntarily for psychiatric treatment. There he was able to leave the hospital. The police checked the criteria for psychiatric surveillance, but because he voluntarily went to psychiatric treatment, the legal criteria was not given.

References 

Crime in Brussels
Stabbing attacks in Belgium
Stabbing attacks in 2022
November 2022 events in Belgium
November 2022 crimes in Europe
Schaerbeek
Attacks on railway stations in Europe
2022 in Brussels